Trammell Crow Company is a real estate development, investment, and property management company. It has been a subsidiary of CBRE Group since 2006.

History
The company was founded by Trammell Crow in 1948.

In June 2006, the company announced that it would be acquired by CBRE Group.

In 2010, the company moved its headquarters from Trammell Crow Center to 2100 McKinney Ave.

References

Companies based in Dallas
Property management companies
Real estate companies of the United States
2006 mergers and acquisitions